Golgi's method is a silver staining technique that is used to visualize nervous tissue under light microscopy. The method was discovered by Camillo Golgi, an Italian physician and scientist, who published the first picture made with the technique in 1873.  It was initially named the black reaction (la reazione nera) by Golgi, but it became better known as the Golgi stain or later, Golgi method.

Golgi staining was used by Spanish neuroanatomist Santiago Ramón y Cajal (1852–1934) to discover a number of novel facts about the organization of the nervous system, inspiring the birth of the neuron doctrine. Ultimately, Ramón y Cajal improved the technique by using a method he termed "double impregnation". Ramón y Cajal's staining technique, still in use, is called Cajal's Stain.

Mechanism

The cells in nervous tissue are densely packed and little information on their structures and interconnections can be obtained if all the cells are stained. Furthermore, the thin filamentary extensions of neural cells, including the axon and the dendrites of neurons, are too slender and transparent to be seen with normal staining techniques. Golgi's method stains a limited number of cells at random in their entirety. The mechanism by which this happens is still largely unknown. Dendrites, as well as the cell soma, are clearly stained in brown and black and can be followed in their entire length, which allowed neuroanatomists to track connections between neurons and to make visible the complex networking structure of many parts of the brain and spinal cord.

Golgi's staining is achieved by impregnating aldehyde fixed nervous tissue with potassium dichromate and silver nitrate. Cells thus stained are filled by microcrystallization of silver chromate.

Technique
According to SynapseWeb, this is the recipe for Golgi's staining technique:

Immerse a block (approx. 10x5 mm) of formaldehyde-fixed (or paraformaldehyde- glutaraldehyde-perfused) brain tissue into a 2% aqueous solution of potassium dichromate for 2 days
Dry the block shortly with filter paper.
Immerse the block into a 2% aqueous solution of silver nitrate for another 2 days.
Cut sections approx. 20–100 µm thick.
Dehydrate quickly in ethanol, clear and mount (e.g., into Depex or Enthalan).

This technique has since been refined to substitute the silver precipitate with gold by immersing the sample in gold chloride then oxalic acid, followed by removal of the silver by sodium thiosulphate. This preserves a greater degree of fine structure with the ultrastructural details marked by small particles of gold.

Quote
Ramón y Cajal said of the Golgi method:

 I expressed the surprise which I experienced upon seeing with my own eyes the wonderful revelatory powers of the chrome-silver reaction and the absence of any excitement in the scientific world aroused by its discovery.
 Recuerdos de mi vida, Vol. 2, Historia de mi labor científica. Madrid: Moya, 1917, p. 76.

References

External links
 Photomicrograph of a cortex cell stained with Golgi's. IHC Image Gallery.
 Golgi impregnations. Images of the brain of flies.
 Visualization of dendritic spines using Golgi Method. SynapseWeb. Includes a time-lapse study of Golgi impregnation.
 Berrebi, Albert: Cell Biology of Neurons: Structure and Methods of Study. (in PDF)
 

Genetics techniques
Staining
History of neuroscience
Neurohistology